Chahar Bagh may refer to:
 Charbagh, a type of Persian garden
 Chaharbagh District, a district in Alborz Province, Iran
 Chaharbagh, a city in Chaharbagh District, Iran
 Chahar Bagh, Golestan, a village in Gorgan County, Golestan Province, Iran
 Chaharbagh, Isfahan, an avenue in Isfahan, Iran
 Chahar Bagh School, a cultural complex on Chaharbagh Avenue, Isfahan, Iran
 Chahar Bagh, North Khorasan, a village in Maneh and Samalqan County, North Khorasan Province, Iran
 Chahar Bagh, Razavi Khorasan, a village in Firuzeh County, Razavi Khorasan Province, Iran
 Chahar Bagh, Quchan, a village in Quchan County, Razavi Khorasan Province, Iran
 Chahar Bagh, Malard, a village in Malard County, Tehran Province, Iran
 Chahar Bagh, Shemiranat, a village in Shemiranat County, Tehran Province, Iran
 Charbagh, Mansehra, a town in Khyber Pakhtunkhwa, Pakistan
 Charbagh, Swabi, a town in Khyber Pakhtunkhwa, Pakistan
 Charbagh, Swat, a village in Swat, Pakistan
 Charbagh, locality in Lucknow, home to Charbagh railway station
 Lucknow Charbagh Railway Station, Lucknow, India